In mathematics, a quadratic integral is an integral of the form

It can be evaluated by completing the square in the denominator.

Positive-discriminant case

Assume that the discriminant q = b2 − 4ac is positive. In that case, define u and A by

and

The quadratic integral can now be written as

The partial fraction decomposition

allows us to evaluate the integral:

The final result for the original integral, under the assumption that q > 0, is

Negative-discriminant case

In case the discriminant q = b2 − 4ac is negative, the second term in the denominator in

is positive.  Then the integral becomes

References
Weisstein, Eric W. "Quadratic Integral." From MathWorld--A Wolfram Web Resource, wherein the following is referenced:

Integral calculus